The Surveyors is a 1972 Swiss drama film directed by Michel Soutter. It was entered into the 1972 Cannes Film Festival.

Cast
 Jean-Luc Bideau as Leon
 Michel Cassagne as Max
 Jacques Denis as Lucien
 Marie Dubois as Alice
 Armen Godel as The Lawyer
 Jacqueline Moore as Ann
 Germaine Tournier as Alice's Mother

References

External links

1972 films
1970s French-language films
1972 drama films
Swiss black-and-white films
Films directed by Michel Soutter
French-language Swiss films